Cow Hollow is a valley in Hickman County, Tennessee, in the United States. 

Cow Hollow was so named on account of cattle being herded there to graze in the 1820s.

References

Landforms of Hickman County, Tennessee
Valleys of Tennessee